Al-Nuayman ibn Amr al-Najjari; nicknamed as Himaar (Arabic word for Donkey) and Abdullah; was a companion of the Islamic prophet Muhammad. He married the sister of Abd al-Rahman ibn Awf, his date of birth is unknown. He died in 652 CE.

Al-Nuayman was known for being a prankster and his pranks were always appreciated by Muhammad.

At one time Al-Nuayman had a habit of drinking alcohol which he got rid off permanently after some time. Despite knowing the ruling of Islam towards the intoxicating drink, he struggled with breaking his addiction, and was beaten with a stick twice for drinking. 

During the second incident, Umar ibn Al-Khattab narrated that a man said: "La 'nat Allah alayhi – may God's curse be on him." Muhammad heard this and responded with "Do not curse him, for by Allah what I know about him is that he loves Allah and His Messenger."

References

External links
biography from MSA West Compendium of Muslim Texts.

Companions of the Prophet
Najjarite people
652 deaths
Practical jokes